Oakdale Cemetery is a historic city cemetery and national historic district located at Hendersonville, Henderson County, North Carolina. It was established in 1885, and has approximately 5,400 burials. The property includes the original 1885 white section and 1885 African American section, along with a number of additions made into the 1950s. It includes a section for Agudas Israel Synagogue - Hendersonville's sole Jewish congregation.  Historic contributing resources include the cemetery, a frame, octagonal pavilion dating from the turn of the 20th century; a 20th-century, rectangular brick mausoleum with a flat roof and terra cotta coping; a large Neoclassical concrete mausoleum, built in 1951; and a 1950s maintenance building.  It includes the Italian marble angel statue which served as the inspiration for Thomas Wolfe's first novel, Look Homeward, Angel (1929).

It was listed on the National Register of Historic Places in 2014.

Gallery

References

African-American history of North Carolina
Cemeteries on the National Register of Historic Places in North Carolina
Historic districts on the National Register of Historic Places in North Carolina
Neoclassical architecture in North Carolina
1885 establishments in North Carolina
Buildings and structures in Henderson County, North Carolina
National Register of Historic Places in Henderson County, North Carolina
Hendersonville, North Carolina